The Decline of British Sea Power is the debut studio album by English indie rock band Sea Power, then known as "British Sea Power", released on 2 June 2003. "The Lonely", "Carrion" and "Remember Me" were all released as singles from the album, as well as older recordings of "Fear of Drowning" and "Remember Me", which differ from the versions on this album.

Track listing
 "Men Together Today" – 0:41
 "Apologies to Insect Life" (Hamilton/Noble/Wood/Yan) – 2:47
 "Favours in the Beetroot Fields" (Yan) – 1:16
 "Something Wicked" (Hamilton) – 3:12
 "Remember Me" (Yan) – 3:10
 "Fear of Drowning" (Yan) – 4:26
 "The Lonely" (Yan) – 5:12
 "Carrion" (Hamilton/Noble/Wood/Yan) – 4:06
 "Blackout" (Hamilton) – 3:48
 "Lately" (Yan) – 13:58
 "A Wooden Horse" (Yan) – 4:37

Japanese release bonus tracks
 "Heavenly Waters" (Hamilton) – 6:35
 "Childhood Memories" (Yan) – 3:36

US release bonus tracks
 "Childhood Memories" (Yan) – 3:36
 "Heavenly Waters" (Hamilton) – 6:35

12 year anniversary reissue bonus discs
THE DECLINE-ERA B-SIDES
"Albert’s Eyes"
"Moley & Me"
"The Smallest Church In Sussex"
"Salty Water"
"Strange Communication"
"Birdy"
"Heavenly Waters"
"A Lovely Day Tomorrow"
"Apologies To Insect Life" (Russian Rock Demo)
"The Scottish Wildlife Experience"
"No Red Indian"
"Good Good Boys"

THE DECLINE ERA, RARE AND LIVE
"Carrion" (concert intro loop)
"Childhood Memories" (single)
"Remember Me" (Gareth Jones mix)
"Carrion" (Mads Bjerke mix)
"A Lovely Day Tomorrow" (Will Sergeant)
"Strange"
"Tugboat"
"A Wooden Horse" (Golden Chariot B-side)
"Fear Of Drowning" (Golden Chariot single)
"The Spirit Of St Louis" (single)
"Out Of My Mind On Dope And Speed"
"A Lovely Day Tomorrow" (Czech EP alternative)
"Fakir" (Czech EP)
"The Smallest Church In Sussex" (instrumental)
"Fear Of Drowning" (Club Sea Power)
"The Scottish Wildlife Experience" (Club Sea Power)
"The Spirit Of St Louis" (Club Sea Power)
"Lately" (Club Sea Power)

THE DECLINE-ERA DEMO RECORDINGS
"We’re Not Like This" (Monnow Valley)
"Memories Of Childhood"
"The Lonely" (organ demo)
"Albert’s Eyes"
"Heavenly Waters" (vocal demo)
"The Smallest Church In Sussex" (piano)
"A Lovely Day Tomorrow"
"Something Wicked" (Hamilton vocal)
"Black Ops With Liberace" ("The Lonely" (demo))
"Always The Sea" (Monnow Valley)
"Blackout"
"Lately"
"The Spirit Of St Louis"
"Theme From Baraka"
"Total War By Rock And Roll"
Unused demo 1
Unused demo 9
Unused demo 3
Unused demo 7
"Diecastings"

Personnel

Sea Power
 Yan (Scott Wilkinson) – Vocals, guitar, piano, organ
 Hamilton (Neil Hamilton Wilkinson) – vocals, bass, guitar, piano, organ, backing vocals
 Noble (Martin Noble) – guitar, piano, backing vocals, organ
 Wood (Matthew Wood) – drums

Additional
 D. Sharp – French horn on "Blackout"
 M. J. Noble – extra backing vocals on "Men Together Today" and "Blackout"
 V. Oag – recorded sea on "Fear of Drowning"

Recording
All songs recorded by Mads Bjerke and British Sea Power at 2 kHz. Excepting "Carrion", recorded at Golden Chariot Studios, Roundhouse and 2 kHz and, with Marc Beatty, at Mockingbird Studio. "Carrion" mixed at The Townhouse by Dave Bascombe.

Release history

References

External links

British Sea Power albums
2003 debut albums
Rough Trade Records albums